Tom McArthur (23 August 1938 – 30 March 2020) was a Scottish linguist, lexicographer, and the founding editor of English Today. 
Among the many books he wrote and edited, he is best known for the Longman Lexicon of Contemporary English, the first thematic monolingual learner's dictionary, which complemented the Longman Dictionary of Contemporary English by bringing together sets of words with related meanings, Worlds of Reference, as well as the Oxford Guide to World English (2002, paperback 2003).

McArthur's most notable work was The Oxford Companion to the English Language (1992), a 1200-page work with 95 contributors and 70 consultants, which was hailed by The Guardian as a "leviathan of accessible scholarship" and was listed on the Sunday Times bestseller list. He published an abridged edition in 1996 and a concise edition in 1998. A second edition was published in 2018, co-edited with Jacqueline Lam McArthur and Lise Fontaine.

McArthur also taught at the University of Exeter's Dictionary Research Centre, which was established in 1984 by Reinhard Hartmann. In 1987 he collaborated with David Crystal to produce an 18-part radio version of a TV series The Story of English for BBC World Service. and in 1997 he co-founded the Asian Association for Lexicography. Earlier, he published books about Indian philosophy and the Bhagavad Gita, and the languages of Scotland, wrote unpublished novels, served as an officer-instructor in the British Army, taught in Sutton Coldfield and in Bombay Cathedral School, and reported for local newspapers.

McArthur died aged 81 on 30 March 2020.

Appointments
 Lecturer and Director of Studies at Extra Mural English Language Courses, University of Edinburgh
 1979–1983: Associate Professor of English, Université du Québec à Trois-Rivières, Canada
 1987–2000: Visiting Professor, Dictionary Research Centre, University of Exeter
 2001: Visiting Professor, Chinese University of Hong Kong, Lingnan University, Xiamen University

References

Academics of the University of Exeter
Linguists from the United Kingdom
1938 births
2020 deaths